Hubert Gardas (born 17 April 1957) is a French fencer. He won a gold medal in the team épée at the 1980 Summer Olympics.

References

External links
 

1957 births
Living people
Sportspeople from Lyon
French male épée fencers
Olympic fencers of France
Fencers at the 1980 Summer Olympics
Olympic gold medalists for France
Olympic medalists in fencing
Medalists at the 1980 Summer Olympics
20th-century French people